The Kalbiyya, or Kalbi or Kelbi tribe is one of four tribes, or tribal confederations, of the Alawite community in Syria. Appearing in historical sources from the 16th century, the Kalbiyya came to prominence when Hafez al-Assad, the son of a Kalbiyya tribal leader, seized power in Syria in a coup in 1970. Assad ensured that power in Syria was concentrated in the hands of members of the Kalbiyya tribe, a policy which his son, Bashar Al-Assad, continued after he became president in 2000. The Kalbiyya population mainly live in the Latakia Governorate in north west Syria.

Background

The Kalbiyya are a tribe, or tribal confederation, of the Alawite community of northwestern Syria. Also known as Nusayris or Alawis, the Alawites are a prominent mystical religious group who follow a syncretic branch of Twelver Shia Islam. 

The Alawite homeland is in the Nusayri mountains coastal region, inland of the Mediterranean ports of Latakia and Tartus. Historically, the Alawites lived in about eighty villages in the region. The Kalbiyya are one of the four tribes, or tribal confederations, into which the Alawite community is divided, the others being the Matawira, Haddadin, and Khayyatin.

Demographics and society

The Kalbiyya were estimated in 2011 to number approximately 480,000 out of a population of 3 million Alawites in Syria. At that time the total Syrian population was around 22 million. The main areas of Kalbiyya settlement are the districts of Jableh, Haffa and Latakia and the town of Qardaha, all within Latakia Governorate in north west Syria. They are the most geographically compact of the Alawite tribes, the others being more dispersed in non-contiguous areas across the coastal region. 

The Kalbiyya consists of five branches: Rashawneh, Junaydi, al-Nawasireh, al-Jurud, and al-Qarahilah. Each branch of an Alawite tribe has its own hereditary chief, a structure which leads to frequent internal disputes within Alawite society. The Junayd family typically provide the leadership of the Kalbiyya and was based at Tell Salhab, near Masyaf. Traditionally, Alawite society is divided into three classes: religious leaders, landowners and peasants, with religious leadership, like chieftaincy, being hereditary.

History

Emergence and Ottoman period
There are no known references to the Kalbiyya in medieval sources. They are not, for instance, mentioned among the tribes led by the 13th century Alawite paramount leader Makzun al-Sinjari. It is only after the Ottoman conquest of Syria in the early 16th century that the Kalbiyya are mentioned in historical records.  Stefan Winter notes that, despite this, they may still have existed as a grouping before the 16th century (but without any "special role" among the Alawites) and their name "may originally have invoked a link" with the medieval Banu Kalb bedouin tribal confederation.

There is evidence that, following the conquest, the Ottomans favoured the Kalbiyya and other tribes for the purposes of using them as part of their local administrative control and tax collection structure. The Kalbiyya's emergence as a recognised group may therefore be linked to this Ottoman policy. Nevertheless, there were a number of Kalbiyya rebellions during the 16th century, and by the beginning of the 19th century, the Kalbiyya had a reputation for lawlessness and were in constant and open conflict with the Ottoman authorities.

In the 1850s, an English missionary, Samuel Lyde lived among the Kalbiyya and built a mission and school in the Kalbiyya village of Bhamra. He subsequently published a negative but influential account of his time there, in which he wrote that he was convinced that they were like St Paul's description of the heathen: "filled with all unrighteousness, fornication, wickedness, covetousness, maliciousness". He criticized their brigandage, feuds, lying and divorce and claimed that "the state of [their] society was a perfect hell upon earth". Lyde's account has been described as "colourful" but "unreliable" in certain respects.

During the French mandate
Following the end of Ottoman rule after World War I, Syria became part of the French mandate, which was subdivided into separate territories including an Alawite State. By 1930, Syria as a whole had an Alawite population of 213,870, of which 50,700 were Kalbiyya. 

The Alawite community was divided between "separatists" who supported the maintenance of a separate Alawite state and "nationalists" or "unionists", who advocated integration into a wider Syrian or even pan-Arab state. The Kalbiyya leadership was similarly divided and through the 1920s and 1930s individual chiefs shifted between separatism and the nationalist/unionist position depending on prevailing opinions within the tribe. Nevertheless, in the negotiations leading to the Alawite State joining the Mandatory Syrian Republic in 1936, even nationalist Kalbiyya chiefs signed letters asking for separation from Syria to be maintained for fear of Sunni domination. One of the Kalbiyya leaders whose signature appears on one of the letters was Ali Sulayman, father of Hafez Al-Assad, later president of Syria.

After Syrian independence
Syria became independent in 1946 but suffered from political instability in its first years and,  in 1963, the Ba'athist coup overthrew the then government. The coup was led by three Alawites: Salah Jadid, Muhammad Umran and Hafez Al-Assad. Assad was from the Kalbiyya tribe, Umran from the Khayyatin, and Jadid from the Haddadin. Following Assad's seizure of sole power in 1970, part of his strategy was to concentrate control in the hands of members of his own Kalbiyya tribe. In 1970, the Kalbiyya numbered 108,800 compared to a total Syrian population of 6,305,000. Although Alawites in general dominated the government, as historian Jordi Tejel points out, in practice "active participation" in the Assad regime was limited to the Kalbiyya. Additionally, there is evidence that the Kalbiyya areas received much greater infrastucture investment and other economic benefits compared to other Alawite areas.

Assad, following his death in 2000, was succeeded as president by his son, Bashar. The latter continued to rule through the same power structures as his father, with the Kalbiyya playing a central role.  With the advent of the 2011 uprising and subsequent civil war, there was even greater focus on this policy. In 20122013, some 90% of regime army generals, according to sources close to the government, were not only Alawite but from the Kalbiyya tribe.

Notable Kalbiyya
Ali Sulayman al-Assad,  tribal leader and father of Hafez al-Assad, d.1963.

Hafez al-Assad, President of Syria 1971-2000.

Bashar al-Assad, President of Syria 2000 to date.

Ali Aslan, Chief of Staff of the Syrian Army 1998-2002.

Ghazi Kanaan, Head of Syrian Intelligence in Lebanon 1982-2002; Syrian Minister of the Interior 2004-2005.

Badawi al-Jabal, Syrian poet, d.1981.

Shafiq Fayadh, Syrian General under Hafez al-Assad.

Notes

References

Bibliography

Alawites
Arab groups
Shia communities
Shia Islamic branches
Politics of Syria